The Minister of State for Refugees is a ministerial office jointly in the Home Office and the Department for Levelling Up, Housing and Communities created in the 2021 cabinet reshuffle. Originally it was created as Minister for Afghan Resettlement.

Responsibilities 
The current minister has following responsibilities:

Ukraine Family Scheme
Homes for Ukraine
Afghan Citizens Resettlement Scheme
Afghan Relocation and Assistance Policy
Hong Kong BN(O)

List of ministers

References 

Lists of government ministers of the United Kingdom
Ministerial offices in the United Kingdom
Home Office (United Kingdom)
2021 establishments in England
2021 establishments in the United Kingdom
British government officials